Hemming Andreas Carlgren (born 8 July 1958) is a Swedish Centre Party politician, and a former Minister for the Environment in the Swedish government.

Education and career 
Andreas Carlgren was born in Västra Ryd, Upplands-Bro Municipality, Stockholm County. From 1981 and 1983 he studied at Stockholm University to pursue teaching. He then worked as chairman of the Centre Party Youth from 1984 to 1987. From 1987 to 1990 he worked as a teacher, followed by employment at M-gruppen, a training company, to work on environmental development programmes for businesses, including environmental audits. From 1990 to 1994 he served as deputy mayor of Ekerö Municipality, with special responsibility for childcare and schools. From 1994 to 1998 he was elected as a member of the parliament of Sweden. In the parliament he was a member of the Committee on Education. In addition, Carlgren served as second deputy chairman of the Centre Party from 1992 to 1998 and as first deputy chairman from 1998 to 2000.

In 2000 Carlgren was appointed as director-general of the Swedish Integration Board. Following the 2006 general election he was appointed as Minister for the Environment in the new centre-right cabinet. One of the main issues that he has to handle as Minister for the Environment is the issue of global warming.

On September 29, 2011, he was succeeded as Minister for the Environment by Lena Ek, who had served as MEP for the Centre Party since 2004. With 4 years and 358 days in office, he is the longest-serving Minister for the Environment.

Carlgren is vice-chair of the Stockholm Environment Institute Board. Carlgren has been on the SEI board since 1 January 2012.

Personal life 
In the late 1990s Carlgren divorced, publicly declared that he was gay, and subsequently entered into a registered partnership with his new partner. He is the first openly gay Swedish cabinet minister. Carlgren has three children from his previous marriage.

References

External links 

 Andreas Carlgren at the Government Offices of Sweden

1958 births
Living people
Swedish educators
Swedish Roman Catholics
People from Upplands-Bro Municipality
Waldorf school alumni
Stockholm University alumni
Members of the Riksdag from the Centre Party (Sweden)
Swedish Ministers for the Environment
Swedish LGBT politicians
Gay politicians